The Vogelkop melidectes (Melidectes leucostephes) is a species of bird in the family Meliphagidae.
It is endemic to West Papua, Indonesia : northern Doberai and western Bomberai peninsula.

Its natural habitat is subtropical or tropical moist montane forest.

References

Vogelkop melidectes
Birds of West Papua
Vogelkop melidectes
Taxonomy articles created by Polbot